Bharat Jangam, also known as Bharat Mani Jangam (born 25 November 1947) is a novelist and freelance journalist from Nepal. He is best known for the book Kalo Surya (Nepali:कालॊ सूय॔). Bharat Jangam is a creator of the "science of anticorruption" in the academic arena. His neo-science is based on modern problems of humans, which is approved Tribhuvan University, Kathmandu. He is also a Hindu activist. He currently lives in Kathmandu, Nepal. He has also been conferred the title of "Father of Anti-Corruption Science".

Early life 
Bharat Jangam was born on 25 November 1947 in an historically and architecturally renowned city called in Bhaktapur of Kathmandu Valley, Nepal. He started his literary works during his childhood. At the age of 15, his poems were published in the local literary magazine for the first time, and gradually stories, essays, articles etc. were published. He graduated from the Tribhuvan University in 1970. After his studies, he himself exhibited as a novelist and journalist in Nepalese society.

Career 
In 1979, he made a sensation in the country by releasing his first novel Kalo Surya (Nepali: कालॊ सूय॔) (The Black Sun). Though the country was ruled by the corrupt people of the partyless panchayat system when writing against the system was a big crime, he fearlessly released his book which explains the exploitation and suppression from the so-called rulers of that system. This book gained popularity in a very short time among the Nepalese readers and to make it acquainted with the foreign readers. It was translated into English language in 1990 and came into the world market in the name of The Black Sun. Later in 1992 it was translated into Russian and Chinese and 1993, it came out in the market in Hindi language with the name Kala Suraj (Hindi: काला सूरज). Then it was again published in Bengali and Urdu languages from Bangladesh. It was then published in Assami and Kanada languages from India as well.

His next novel, Byuha Chakra (The Vicious Circle) was written in 1984. He has given a transparent view of the aristocratic rulers, nonpolitical system and has pointed out its weaknesses. This book is mainly based on the monstrous circles of all kinds of corruption caused by the ruthless rulers of the partyless panchayat system that crumbled during the recent democratic uprising in 1990. The novel became very popular in the country and was later translated into English and Hindi languages in India.

In 1988, he was an editor and publisher of the weekly newspaper Nepal Awaz (Nepali: नॆपाल आवाज) for 3 years, from 1988, and made great contribution in the development and stability of the democracy in the country through journalism. He was also a regular columnist on political situation in Nepal and later it was consolidate in a book and was released in the name of Pachas Prasang in 1992.

In 1993, he released another novel Rato Gham (Nepali: रातॊ घाम) (The Red Sun), a novel, whose story surrounds in the socio-economic problems in Greater China after 1949's great revolution and after the implementation of Mao-Tse-Tungs's neo-proletarian thoughts. It also focuses on the pitiable condition of the Tibetan people after the invasion of the Tibet and exposes the Human Rights Violation. In this book, Mr. Jangam has indirectly called for the liberation of 1.5 billion people of China who have been suppressed by the Communist Regime. He has given his views that any decision that is made by human mind is not, and cannot be, final. Human beings keep willing to change at every pace. Being a Nepali by origin, he has succeeded to narrate the ins and outs of then present China. After receiving commendation and popularity from all circles of intellectuals, it was translated into English and Hindi language in the same year in India. In the same year (1993) he published Nepali Congress Ko Samanya Gyan (a book of general knowledge of Nepali Congress Party). In 1996 he started an anti-corruption movement. In 1999 he started Interaction program in colleges and university to develop a new subject 'Science of Anti-corruption'. He published Bhrastachar: Baicharik Andolan in 2004.

Books and publications 
This first and the most famous novel Kalo Surya (Nepali: कालॊ सूय॔) has been translated into English, Hindi, Urdu, Chinese, Russian, Japanese, Assami, Maithali, Kanada and Newari languages. He has written several other books in Nepali language, of which some are translated into other foreign languages. Rato Gham (Nepali: रातॊ घाम) and Biuha Chakra (Nepali: व्य़ूह चॠ)are translated into English and Hindi languages.

Kalo Surya (Nepali: कालॊ सूय॔ ) 
Red Sun (Nepali: रातॊ घाम)
Biuha Chakra (Nepali:व्य़ूह चॠ)
Pachas Prasang (Nepali:पचास प्र)
Nepali Congress Ko Samanya Gyan (Nepali: नेपाली कागेसकॊ सामन्य य़ान)
Bichar ra Dristikond (Nepali:बिचार र बिमस॔). 
Bhrastachar: Baicharik Andolan (Nepali: भष्टाचार: वैचारिक आन्दोलन). 
 Khopadesh (Nepali:ख्वपदॆश). 
Urliyeka Lahar Haru (Nepali:उलिंएका लहरहरू). 
Chachalkiyeka Rahar Haru (Nepali:छचल्किएका रहरहरू). 
Nirband Bandan (Nepali:निर्बन्ध बन्धन)

Translated version of the books

Kalo Surya 
Kalo Surya originally in Nepali has been translated into several languages:
The Black sun in English by Saroj Kumar Sakya
Kala Suraj in Hindi by Dr. Ram Dayal Rakesh
Hai Thayang in Chinese by Zhou and lee
Chorne Suns in Russian by Alekhgendar Pablov
Kuraji Taiyo in Japanese by Kaji Hito Sahegi
Kalo Surya in Bengali by Sehabuddin Ahamad
Kala Suraj in Urdu by S.A. Sidhiqi
Kala Khurj in Assamese by Geeta Upadhyaya
Kari Suraj in Maithali by Dr. Ram Dayal Rakesh
Hakumha Suryadyo in Newari by Druba Madhkarmi
Kappu Surya in Kannada by Prof. Nagrajan

Rato Gham 
Rato Gham originally in Nepali has been translated into two languages:
The Red Sun in English  by Saroj Kumar Sakya
Lal Suraj in Hindi by Dr. Ram Dayal Rakesh

Biuha Chakra 
Biuha Chakra originally in Nepali has been translated into two languages:
The Vicious Circle in English by Saroj Kumar Sakya
Chakra Byuha in Hindi by Hari Pandya

Other books 
Bharatendu Nepali भरतेन्दु is a Mahākāvya written by P. Yagyabakya describing the life of Bharat Jangam.
Kaljahi byaktityo Bharat JangamNepali कालजयी व्यळित्व भरत जङम() by Hari Manjushree (Nepali हरि मन्जु) is the collection of articles written about Bharat Jangam on his achievements on different aspects of life.

Anticorruption activist and Path to Academics 
In 1996, Bharat Jangam started interaction program in colleges and university to develop a new subject 'Science of Anti-corruption'. A notion "Science of Anticorruption" is an invaluable gift to the Academic-World. He has published hundreds of articles and presented dozens of papers in various seminars and meetings on anti-corruption. He is also a founder and president of the 'Forum for Independent Thinking'. The Forum has launched many activities against corruption and turmoil in Nepalese society.
On 25 Dec 2011, he started the national Campaign against Corruption in the 75 districts in Nepal.
 The team plans to start its anti-corruption drive from Mahakali, the western order of the country and conclude it in Mechi, the eastern border.

Bharat Jangam filed the writ in Supreme Court to stop constituent Assembly term extension in Nepal.

Advocate Bharat Jangam also filed a writ petition on supreme court demanding annulment of the government decision to provide lifelong state facilities to former Prime Ministers, Chief Justices, Home Ministers and Speakers.
The Supreme Court issued an interim order asking the government not to implement the ordinance introduced to provide lifelong state facilities to the former VVIPs.

Anticorruption talk programme by Bharat Jangam was held on 9 August in Kathmandu organized by FAAN (Fulbright Alumni Association).

He is also developing the science called anticorruptology. It is a branch of science which deals with the study of anticorruption and its different aspects. Anticorruptology is a branch of social science.

On 23 June 2020, Tribhuwan University approved the course of Anti-Corruption in master's degree. With this, Tribhuwan University becomes the first University in the World to start a master's degree course on Anti-Corruption Studies. With more than a decade of work on development of Anti-Corruption Science and finally taking the initiation to introduce it into Academics. For this scholastic achievement, he has played a pivotal role and superintendence and his untiring and unwavering effort has been rewarded. He terms it as just the beginning of a long battle ahead to produce Anti-Corruption experts and that inturn will help to take a step forward in introducing the course in lower level of educations as well. This academic facade is one of the new dimensions of his 4 decades of activism against corruption.

Tribhuwan University is set to start the classes from April 2021. The course is designed to have 63 credit hours and 2 years duration with a total of 4 semesters. The Syllabus has been approved by the Academic Council. The course is being run in close cooperation and coordination of Anti-Corruption Academy and Author of Anticorruptology Mr. Bharat Jangam. Dr. Yogesh Ranjit has been appointed as the coordinator.

Father of Anti Corruption Science 
Bharat Jangam has been involved in anti-corruption movement since 1970 and in 2016 developed and registered the science of anticorruption called Anticorruptology. Anticorruptology is the science to study the phenomenon of corruption and build evidence based knowledge to fight it. With his constant lobbying, Tribhuwan University approved the Science and recognized it by making it a course of study in master's degree. With due recognition of his work and contribution to global society with Science of Anti-Corruption and being the first person to do so, he has been conferred with the title of, "Father of Anticorruption Science"

Pashupatinath Temple 
Bharat Mani Jangam is also dubbed "Pashupatinath Temple's lawyer" for frequently challenging the state's moves to interfere in the running of the 7th-century temple. He filed a PIL in the Supreme Court, pleading to strike down the decision taken by the caretaker government to open the main treasury of the fifth-century shrine. He argued that the caretaker government has no right to open the more-than-2000-year-old treasury of the Hindu shrine. In 2008–2009, he stayed against Nepal Maoist government's decision to sack the Indian priest at the Pashupati temple. Appointing Indian priests is the centuries-old tradition. The unprecedented opposition forced the then prime minister Pushpa Kamal Dahal prachanda to roll back the decision after five days.
He filed another petition against a Christian cemetery in Pashupatinath. He said non-Hindus should not be allowed to encroach on Hindu land. The forest is considered sacred by Hindus and is used by them to make offerings to their ancestors. If the Christians want a burial land, they should go to the government, not encroach on the land of a Hindu shrine that is also a UNESCO-declared World Heritage site.

Doleshwor Mahadev 

Bharat Jangam had been claiming and researching that Doleshwar Mahadev is the head part of Shri Kedarnath ji for years. On 22 August 2009 the chief priest of Shri Kedarnath ji temple, Kedarnath Swarup Bhimashankar Linga Shivacharya unveiled the plaque claiming that Doleswore mahadev, located in Jangam math Bhaktapur, is the head part of Shri Kedarnath. This is also mentioned in the Sheela Lekh at the Doleshwar Mahadev.

References

External links 
Anticorruption Movement Nepal
Bharat Jangam
Jangam.np
Lord Pashupatinath's land encroached by Christians for Cemetery
Doleswore Mahadev
Doleshwore Mahadev 

20th-century Nepalese poets
Living people
Nepalese journalists
Nepali-language writers
Tribhuvan University alumni
1947 births
People from Bhaktapur
Nepalese Hindus
Hindu activists
Nepalese activists
Anti-corruption activists
Nepalese male poets
20th-century male writers